Dr Rajendra Prakash Singh (24 July 1945 – 5 February 2020) was an Indian physician and politician from Madhya Pradesh belonging to Bharatiya Janata Party. He was a legislator of the  Madhya Pradesh Legislative Assembly. He was a minister of the Government of Madhya Pradesh too.

Biography
Singh was elected as a legislator of the Madhya Pradesh Legislative Assembly from Roun 1990. Later, he was appointed as the health and general administration department minister in the cabinet of Sunderlal Patwa. He was also elected from Roun in 1993.

Singh died of cancer on 5 February 2020 at the age of 75.

References

1940s births
2020 deaths
People from Bhind district
Bharatiya Janata Party politicians from Madhya Pradesh
State cabinet ministers of Madhya Pradesh
Madhya Pradesh MLAs 1990–1992
Madhya Pradesh MLAs 1993–1998
Medical doctors from Madhya Pradesh
Deaths from cancer in India